Mata, sometimes Matta, is a Portuguese and Spanish surname.

It may refer to:
 Bryan Mata (born 1999), Venezuelan baseball player
 Clinton Mata (born 1992), Angolan footballer
 Eduardo Mata (1942–1995), Mexican conductor and composer
 Ernesto Mata (1915–2012), Filipino military figure
 Francisco Mata (1932–2011), Venezuelan singer and composer
 Juan Mata (born 1988), Spanish footballer
 Lorenzo Mata (born 1986) Mexican-American basketball player
 Olga Mata, Venezuelan woman detained for publishing a humorous TikTok video
 Marcelino da Mata (1940–2021), Guinean-Português Army officer
 Mario Suárez Mata (born 1987), Spanish footballer
 Marta Mata (1926–2006), Spanish pedagogue and politician
 Néstor Mata (born 1926), Filipino journalist 
 Werner Mata (fl. 1969–1973), American soccer player

Spanish-language surnames
Portuguese-language surnames